or Hatsukoi Monster is a Japanese shōjo manga series written by Akira Hiyoshimaru and published in Kodansha's Aria magazine. An anime television adaptation aired from July to September 2016.

Plot
The story follows 15-year-old Kaho Nikaidō as she leaves home to live in a high school dormitory. Almost getting hit by a truck, she is saved by a boy named Kanade Takahashi. She falls in love with him, only to discover that he is her landlord's son and a fifth grader.

Characters

Kaho is a 15-year-old girl and falls in love with Kanade after he saves her from an accident. As the spoiled daughter of an elderly rich couple, she has found it difficult to make friends.

A fifth grader and the object of Kaho's affections. He is 10 years old, but looks significantly older. Although he mostly behaves his age, he at times shows mature behaviour, passed on from his deceased mother who serves as his role model.

One of Kanade's friends and a delinquent. Like Kanade he's also considerably tall for his age.

A grade schooler and another of Kanade's friends. Like Kanade he's also considerably tall for his age. His father is an OB/GYN where he is groomed to follow his father's profession.

Another of Kanade's friends, but of normal size. Contrary to his age, he is far more mature, level-headed and insightful than his peers, to the point that it surprises Kaho and Kanade's circle consider him their leader. He disapproves of their relationship due to their age difference and believing that Kanade only clings to her out of lack of a maternal figure. Despite this he still addresses Kaho respectfully. Since he has a butler it is hinted he comes from a rich family.

Kanade's cousin. He has a strong kansai dialect and is one year older than Kanade. Both him and Kanade get along very well. He has an interest on Kaho.

A first-year high schooler who was in love with Kaho. He's one of the residents of Kaho's dorm. Due to being a shy individual he's often the victim of many of Kanade's circles stunts, as well as being teased frequently by Chiaki due to his crush on Kaho and his inability to act and being easily scared on several matters. He hides an effeminate face under his bangs.

A college student and Kaho's rival. He bears an extremely hostile attitude towards Kaho. He claims to be interested in Kanade though as the anime progresses he seems to develop feelings for Kaho.

Kaho's strange neighbor. He likes and collects cute things and is a hardcore fan of the idol Renren. He dates Chiaki who accepts him as he is, although she is often annoyed with his otaku fanaticism.

Kaho's older brother. He went to America for some time. Despite calling himself a "doting brother" he in fact has a morbid obsession with Kaho, going as far as collect items she has used (such as chopsticks or leftovers) and place them in a plastic bag.

One of the residents at Kaho's dorm. She is serious and level-headed and often serves as a voice of reason. She finds the relationship between Kaho and Kanade to be amusing and frequently teases Shinohara for his personality. She dates and accepts Arashi despite his weird tendencies.

One of the residents at Kaho's dorm. While she tends to be composed on the outside, deep down she has a morbid obsession with Shūgo, going as far as stealing his underwears and sniffing them. When noticed or denied her fetish by others, she can enter into a frenzy where she demonstrates animalistic behavior, which cannot be stopped unless she gets what she wants. When provoked she speaks on a deeply foul language.

Kanade's father and the landlord of the dorm.

One of Kanade's classmates, who has a crush on him.

A butler for Kazuo.

An androgynous boy, who is also a cross-dressing idol. He's the object of fanaticism by Arashi, much to Chiaki's chagrin.

Media

Manga
First Love Monster is written by Akira Hiyoshimaru, who began publishing the manga in Kodansha's shōjo magazine Aria on 28 January 2013. Its last chapter in the magazine was published on 28 November 2016. On 3 March 2017, the manga started publishing on pixiv Comics.

Yen Press announced in October 2014 that it had acquired the rights to publish the series in English.

Volume list

Audio drama
The limited edition versions of volumes three, four, and five include an audio drama CD.

Anime
An anime adaptation of the series was announced in the August issue of Aria. The cast of the audio dramas reprised their roles for the anime. The series aired from July to September 2016. Studio Deen produced the anime, with Takayuki Inagaki directed the series and Mariko Oka designed the characters. The anime has been licensed by Funimation and by Madman Entertainment for streaming. Medialink licensed the series in South and Southeast Asia and streaming this anime in their YouTube channel. The anime ran for 12 episodes, released over 6 Blu-ray and DVD volumes. An OVA episode was bundled with the manga's 8th volume and released on 17 February 2017.

Episode list

Reception
Rebecca Silverman, reviewing the first volume for Anime News Network, gave it an overall grade of C−. She criticized the series for its attempts at serious romance in what was essentially a comedy, and also found fault with author's skill at drawing people. She was most heavily critical of the age gap between the two romantic leads, commenting that upon examination, "First Love Monster comedy is overwhelmed by its creepy factor." She did, however, praise the series' dialogue, stating that "the way Kanade talks is a fun mixture of childlike and more adult."

References

External links

  at Aria 
 Anime official website 
 

Anime series based on manga
Funimation
Kodansha manga
Romantic comedy anime and manga
School life in anime and manga
Shōjo manga
Yen Press titles
Medialink